Rubik may refer to:

 Rubik (surname)
 Rubik (town), town in Albania
 Rubik (band), Finnish pop/rock band

See also 
 Rubik's Cube
 Ernő Rubik, creator of the Rubik's Cube
 Alfrēds Rubiks (born 1935), Latvian politician